John Kern Earle (March 22, 1921 – December 9, 2010) was an American politician. He served as a member of the South Carolina House of Representatives.

Life and career 
Earle attended Greenville High School and Furman University.

In 1967, Earle was elected to the South Carolina House of Representatives, representing Greenville County, South Carolina.

Earle died in December 2010, at the age of 89.

References 

1921 births
2010 deaths
Members of the South Carolina House of Representatives
20th-century American politicians
Furman University alumni